The enzyme homocysteine desulfhydrase (EC 4.4.1.2) catalyzes the chemical reaction

L-homocysteine + H2O = hydrogen sulfide + NH3 + 2-oxobutanoate (overall reaction)
(1a) L-homocysteine = hydrogen sulfide + 2-aminobut-2-enoate
(1b) 2-aminobut-2-enoate = 2-iminobutanoate (spontaneous)
(1c) 2-iminobutanoate + H2O = 2-oxobutanoate + NH3 (spontaneous)

This enzyme belongs to the family of lyases, specifically the class of carbon-sulfur lyases.  The systematic name of this enzyme class is L-homocysteine hydrogen-sulfide-lyase (deaminating; 2-oxobutanoate-forming). Other names in common use include homocysteine desulfurase, L-homocysteine hydrogen-sulfide-lyase (deaminating).  This enzyme participates in nitrogen and sulfur metabolism.  It employs one cofactor, pyridoxal phosphate.

References 

 

EC 4.4.1
Pyridoxal phosphate enzymes
Enzymes of unknown structure